The New York College of Music was an American conservatory of music located in Manhattan that flourished from 1878 to 1968.  The college was incorporated under the laws of New York and was empowered to confer diplomas and degrees ranging from a Bachelor of Music to a Doctor of Music. The conservatory was later repurposed after a merger with New York University and developed into the Music and Performing Arts Professions department of the Steinhardt School of Culture, Education, and Human Development.

History 
The New York College of Music was established in 1878 by Louis Alexander (1839–1903) and flourished for the next 90 years. Its first location was 163 East 70th Street. The faculty, around the time of its founding, included conductor Theodore Thomas and pianist Rafael Joseffy. Alexander Lambert (1862–1929), a pianist, served as the second director from 1887 to 1905. On September 1, 1891, he moved the college to a "handsome new building" at 128-130 East 58th Street.  Faculty under Lambert included pianist Leopold Godowsky.

Later directors included Carl Hein (1864–1945) and August Fraemcke (1870–1933), who served as co-directors.  In 1920, Hein and Fraemcke moved the college to its third and final home at 114–116 East 85th Street.  At the death of Fraemcke in 1933, Hein carried on as director until his own death in 1945. Arved Kurtz (1899–1995) succeeded Hein and remained director until 1965.  In 1965, Jerrold Ross (born 1935), became President of the College, the youngest in its history, and remained in the position until 1967.

Under Hein and Fraemcke, faculty included Hans Letz, who headed the violin department.  He was one of the foremost musicians in the country. From 1912 to 1917 he was member of the Kneisel Quartet and later first violinist with the Letz Quartet. The piano department was under the direction of Fraemcke.  Cornelius Rybner (de) in the mid 1920s, took the place of Rubin Goldmark as the head of the theory and composition department.  The vocal department was under the direction of Carl Hein.  William Ebann (1873–1945), principal cellist with the Philadelphia Orchestra from 1901 to 1902 and also cellist with the New York Philharmonic, headed the cello department for 45 years, until his death. Wilbur Luyster (1871–1949) was the director of the sight-singing department.

In 1920 the conservatory absorbed the German Conservatory and in 1923 it took over the American Conservatory. In 1958 the school presented the United States premiere of Benjamin Britten's The Turn of the Screw.

After nine decades of operation, the conservatory closed in June 1968 after a merger with New York University and be reinvented as the Steinhardt School. At the time of its closing, the New York College of Music was the oldest music conservatory in New York.

Notable alumni 

 Lil Hardin Armstrong, composer, onetime wife of Louis Armstrong
 Ludmilla Azova, operatic soprano
 Leonardo Balada, composer
 Cy Coleman, composer, songwriter, and jazz pianist
 Orpha-F. Deveaux, organist and pianist
 Jack Fina, bandleader, songwriter, and pianist
 Bob Griffiths, playwright, and organist
 Jerry Gonzalez,  jazz trumpeter and percussionist
 Talib Rasul Hakim, composer
 Harley Hamilton, conductor, violinist, and composer
 Oswald Hoepfner, sculptor
 Lucy Kelston, operatic soprano
 Jerome Kern, musical theatre and popular music composer
 Karl Kohn, composer
 Barry Manilow, song writer, singer, pianist
 René McLean, saxophonist and flutist
 Sal Mosca, jazz pianist
 Charles Previn, film composer
 Cornelius L. Reid, vocal pedagogue
 James Sample, conductor
 Mordecai Sandberg, composer
 Alvin Singleton, composer
 Alan Silva, jazz bassist
 Ferdinand Sorenson, cellist, conductor, and composer
 Cecil Taylor, jazz pianist
 Fred Weinberg, composer
 Margaret Jones Wiles, composer
 Ilse Gerda Wunsch, composer

Awards and honorary degrees 
 New York College of Music Medal
 1932 – Richard Strauss, composer

 Honorary Doctor of Music
 1945 – Anders Emile, composer and professor at Hunter College
 1946 – Philip James, composer, conductor, educator
 1949 – Jan Peerce, opera tenor
 1953 – Walter Piston, composer
 1954 – Marion Bauer, composer
 1955 – Peter Wilhousky, composer
 1956 – Wilfrid Pelletier, conductor
 1956 – Julius Preuver (de), conductor

Notable faculty

 Hubert de Blanck, pianist and composer
 Marion Bauer, composer
 Paul Creston, composer
 Ania Dorfmann, pianist
 Emanuel Feuermann, cellist
 Leopold Godowsky, pianist and composer
 Rubin Goldmark, theory and composition
 William James Henderson, musical critic and scholar
 Rafael Joseffy, pianist
 Erich Katz, musicologist
 Edgar Stillman Kelley, composer, conductor, and writer on music
 Hans Kronold, cellist and composer
 Siegfried Landau, conductor and composer
 Frederic Lillebridge, pianist and composer 
 Vladimir Padwa, composer and pianist
 Vittorio Rieti, composer
 Cornelius Rybner (de), theory and composition
 Mordecai Sandberg, composer
 Theodore Thomas, conductor
 Jacob Weinberg, composer and pianist
 Stefan Wolpe, composer

Bibliographic collections 
 Vladimir Padwa Collection at the Peabody Conservatory
 Correspondence: with Marian Anderson (1965); 
 "Reminiscences of Otto Herz" (oral history; 1975); 
 "Erich Katz Collection, 1918–2007;" 
 "Interview with Isaac Nemiroff (1974);

References

External links
 163 East 70th Street
 128-130 East 58th Street
 114–116 East 85th Street

 
Educational institutions established in 1878
Music schools in New York City
1878 establishments in New York (state)